Haruki is both a masculine/neutral Japanese given name and a Japanese surname. Notable people with the name include:

Given name:

, Japanese footballer 
, Japanese-born theatre performer
, Japanese footballer 
, Nippon Professional Baseball player for the Nishitetsu Lions
, Japanese voice actor
, Japanese footballer 
, Japanese publisher, film producer, director and screenwriter
Haruki Kanashiro (born 1977), Peruvian footballer
, Japanese architectural translator 
, Japanese footballer 
, Japanese footballer 
, Japanese diplomat
, Japanese writer and translator
, Japanese darts player
Haruki Nakamura (born 1986), American football safety
, Japanese professional baseball player
, Japanese baseball player
, Japanese footballer
, Japanese football player
, Japanese footballer 
, Japanese footballer
, former judoka from Japan
, Japanese football player
Haruki Yamashita (born 1999), Japanese cross-country skier
, Japanese footballer

Surname:
, Japanese manga artist
, Japanese mathematician
, Japanese artistic gymnast
, Japanese actress

Fictional characters 

 Haruki Komi (小見春樹), a character from the manga and anime Haikyu!! with the position of libero from Fukurōdani Academy.

See also
Haruki Station, train station in Kishiwada, Osaka Prefecture, Japan

Japanese-language surnames
Japanese masculine given names